Postplatyptilia transversus is a moth of the family Pterophoridae. It is known from Brazil and Colombia.

The wingspan is 15–16 mm. Adults are on wing in March in Colombia and in September in Brazil.

Etymology
The name reflects the transcontinental difference between the collecting localities of the type specimens.

References

transversus
Moths described in 2006